Lip gloss is a makeup product used on the lips.

Lip gloss may also refer to:
"Lip Gloss", a 2007 song by Lil Mama
"Lipgloss" (song), a 1993 song by Pulp
Lipgloss (TV series), a Filipino drama